Burnstine is a surname. Notable people with the surname include:

David Burnstine (1900–1965), American bridge player
Ken Burnstine (died 1976), American drug smuggler
Susan Burnstine (born 1966), American photographer and journalist

See also
Bernstine